The men's team pursuit race of the 2015–16 ISU Speed Skating World Cup 1, arranged in the Olympic Oval, in Calgary, Alberta, Canada, was held on 14 November 2015.

The Canadian team won the race, while the South Korean team came second, and the Italian team came third.

Results
The race took place on Saturday, 14 November, in the afternoon session, scheduled at 13:55.

Note: NR = national record.

References

Men team pursuit
1